James Bradley Spencer (April 26, 1781 – March 26, 1848) was a U.S. Representative from New York, serving one term from 1837 to 1839.

Biography 
Born in Salisbury, Connecticut, Spencer received a limited education. He moved to Franklin County, New York, and settled in Fort Covington. He raised a company for the War of 1812, and served as Captain in the Twenty-ninth United States Infantry. He was appointed a local magistrate in 1814 and was Surrogate of Franklin County 1828–1837. He was appointed loan commissioner in 1829 and served as member of the state assembly in 1831 and 1832.

Congress 
Spencer was elected as a Democrat to the Twenty-fifth Congress (March 4, 1837 – March 3, 1839).

Death 
He died in Fort Covington, New York, March 26, 1848. He was interred probably in the Old Cemetery near Fort Covington.

Sources

External links 
 
 

1781 births
1848 deaths
United States Army officers
Democratic Party members of the United States House of Representatives from New York (state)
Democratic Party members of the New York State Assembly
People from Salisbury, Connecticut
People from Fort Covington, New York
19th-century American politicians
Spencer family of New York
United States Army personnel of the War of 1812
People from New York (state) in the War of 1812